Halil Suleyman "Sul" Ozerden (born December 5, 1966) is a United States district judge of the United States District Court for the Southern District of Mississippi and a former nominee to be a Circuit Judge for the United States Court of Appeals for the Fifth Circuit.

Biography
Ozerden was born in Hattiesburg, Mississippi to a Turkish family. He obtained his undergraduate education at Edmund A. Walsh School of Foreign Service at Georgetown University in Washington, D.C., receiving a Bachelor of Science in Foreign Service. Sul was also a four-year Navy ROTC scholarship student, serving as battalion executive officer (1989). Upon receiving his commission as a naval officer, he completed United States Navy Flight School in Pensacola, Florida, from 1989 to 1990, and was designated a naval flight officer. Ozerden also obtained his Juris Doctor in 1998 from Stanford Law School, and served as associate editor for the Stanford Law Review.

Professional career
Ozerden served as a commissioned officer in the United States Navy from 1989 to 1995. His military service included: naval flight officer/bombardier-navigator, A-6E Intruder; over 1,000 flight hours; mission commander qualified; two six-month Western Pacific deployments aboard the USS Kitty Hawk; head of Safety Department; Navy Commendation Medal for missions flown in Operation Restore Hope (Somalia) and Operation Southern Watch (Iraq); and the Navy Achievement Medal. He was honorably discharged with the rank of lieutenant (O-3).

Ozerden began his legal career as a law clerk for United States District Judge Eldon E. Fallon of the Eastern District of Louisiana from 1998 to 1999 and also served as a private practice attorney licensed in Mississippi from 1999 to 2007.

Federal judicial service

On the recommendation of United States Senators Thad Cochran and Trent Lott, President George W. Bush nominated Ozerden to be a United States District Judge for the Southern District of Mississippi on January 8, 2007.  He was confirmed by the United States Senate by a vote of 95–0 on April 24, 2007 and received his commission on May 1, 2007.

Nomination to appellate court 

On June 11, 2019, President Trump announced his intent to nominate Ozerden to serve as a United States circuit judge for the United States Court of Appeals for the Fifth Circuit. On June 24, 2019, his nomination was sent to the Senate. He was nominated to the seat vacated by E. Grady Jolly, who assumed senior status on October 3, 2017. On July 17, 2019, a hearing on his nomination was held before the Senate Judiciary Committee. On September 12, 2019, Senator Ted Cruz announced his opposition to the nomination. The Judiciary Committee was scheduled to vote on recommending Ozerden on September 26, 2019, but the vote was postponed after Senator Josh Hawley joined Ted Cruz in his opposition to Ozerden's elevation to the Circuit Court. On January 3, 2020, his nomination was returned to the President under Rule XXXI, Paragraph 6 of the United States Senate.

Memberships

Ozerden became a member of the Federalist Society in 2019.

See also 
 Donald Trump judicial appointment controversies

References

External links

 District Judge Sul Ozerden
Justice Department resume

1966 births
Living people
American people of Turkish descent
Georgetown University alumni
Walsh School of Foreign Service alumni
Federalist Society members
Stanford University alumni
United States Navy officers
United States Naval Flight Officers
Judges of the United States District Court for the Southern District of Mississippi
Military personnel from Mississippi
People from Hattiesburg, Mississippi
United States district court judges appointed by George W. Bush
21st-century American judges